Chief Cyprian Odiatu Duaka Ekwensi  (26 September 1921 – 4 November 2007) was a Nigerian author of novels, short stories, and children's books.

Biography

Early life, education and family
Cyprian Odiatu Duaka Ekwensi, an Igbo, was born in Minna, Niger State. He is a native of Nkwelle Ezunaka in Oyi local government area, Anambra State, Nigeria. His father was David Anadumaka, a story-teller and elephant hunter.

Ekwensi attended Government College in Ibadan, Oyo State, Achimota College in Ghana, and the School of Forestry, Ibadan, after which he worked for two years as a forestry officer. He also studied pharmacy at Yaba Technical Institute, Lagos School of Pharmacy, and the Chelsea School of Pharmacy of the University of London. He taught at Igbobi College.

Ekwensi married Eunice Anyiwo, and they had five children. He has many grandchildren, including his son Cyprian Ikechi Ekwensi, who is named after his grandfather, and his oldest grandchild Adrianne Tobechi Ekwensi.

Governmental career
Ekwensi was employed as Head of Features at the Nigerian Broadcasting Corporation (NBC) and by the Ministry of Information during the First Republic; he eventually became Director of the latter. He resigned his position in 1966, before the Civil War, and moved to Enugu with his family. He later served as chair of the Bureau for External Publicity of Biafra, prior to its reabsorption by Nigeria.

Literary career
Ekwensi wrote hundreds of short stories, radio and television scripts, and several dozen novels, including children's books. His 1954 People of the City was his first book to garner international attention.
His novel Drummer Boy (1960), based on the life of Benjamin 'Kokoro' Aderounmu was a perceptive and powerful description of the wandering, homeless and poverty-stricken life of a street artist.
His most successful novel was Jagua Nana (1961), about a Pidgin-speaking Nigerian woman who leaves her husband to work as a prostitute in a city and falls in love with a teacher. He also wrote a sequel to this, Jagua Nana's Daughter.

In 1968, he received the Dag Hammarskjöld's International Prize in Literature. In 2001, he was made an MFR and in 2006, he became a fellow of the Nigerian Academy of Letters.

Death
Ekwensi died on 4 November 2007 at the Niger Foundation in Enugu, where he underwent an operation for an undisclosed ailment. The Association of Nigerian Authors (ANA), having intended to present him with an award on 16 November 2007, converted the honour to a posthumous award.

Selected works
 When Love Whispers (1948)
 An African Night's Entertainment (1948)
 The Boa Suitor (1949)
 The Leopard's Claw (1950)
 People of the City (London: Andrew Dakers, 1954)(This novel has been translated into Sinhala by Kumudu Champike Jayawardana (නුවරු – කුමුදු චම්පික ජයවර්ධන))
 The Drummer Boy (1960)
 The Passport of Mallam Ilia (written 1948, published 1960)
 Jagua Nana (1961)
 Burning Grass (1961)
 An African Night's Entertainment (1962)
 Beautiful Feathers (novel; London: Hutchinson, 1963)
 Rainmaker (short stories; 1965)
 Iska (London: Hutchinson, 1966)
 Lokotown and Other Stories (Heinemann, 1966)
 Restless City and Christmas Gold (1975)
 Divided We Stand: a Novel of the Nigerian Civil War (1980)
 Motherless Baby (Nigeria: Fourth Dimension Publishing Company, 1980)
 Jagua Nana's Daughter (1987)
 Behind the Convent Wall (1987)
 The Great Elephant Bird (Evans Brothers, 1990
 Gone to Mecca (Heinemann Educational Books, 1991)
 Jagua Nana's Daughter (1993)
 Masquerade Time (children's book; London: Chelsea House Publishing; Jaws Maui, 1994)
 Cash on Delivery (2007, collection of short stories)

References

Further reading
 
 
 Shola Adenekan, Cyprian Ekwensi obituary, The Guardian, 24 January 2008
 Sonnie Ekwowusi, "Ode to a Literary Colossus", This Day, 13 November 2007 (column by former student)

External links
 List of books, Literary map of Africa: West Africa – Nigeria.

1921 births
2007 deaths
Government College, Ibadan alumni
Nigerian male novelists
Alumni of Achimota School
Nigerian children's writers
People from Minna
Igbo writers
Igbo children's writers
Igbo pharmacists
Igbo novelists
20th-century Nigerian novelists
21st-century Nigerian writers
People of the Nigerian Civil War

International Writing Program alumni
20th-century male writers
Nigerian expatriates in the United Kingdom